Claudia Huckle is a British operatic contralto.

Huckle studied at the Royal College of Music, the New England Conservatory and the Curtis Institute of Music. She was the first woman to win the Birgit Nilsson Prize for singing Wagner, at Operalia 2013.

References

English opera singers
Living people
Operatic contraltos
Alumni of the Royal College of Music
New England Conservatory alumni
Year of birth missing (living people)